Beinwil Abbey (Kloster Beinwil) was a Benedictine monastery in Beinwil in the Canton of Solothurn in Switzerland.

History

It was founded around 1100, probably by the local nobility and was first mentioned in 1147. After conflicts arising from the territorial claims of the towns of Solothurn and Basel against the Counts of Thierstein, who acted as the abbey's  Vögte (lords protectors), it was burnt down in 1445. After Beinwil had been taken over by Solothurn in 1519, the town authorities impounded much of the abbey's possessions.

By the 16th century only a few monks were left in the abbey, and it was formally dissolved in 1554. A small community remained, the care of which was assumed firstly by Einsiedeln Abbey, in 1589, and then, from 1622, by Rheinau Abbey. As no monastic revival could be achieved in the remoteness of its situation, it was decided to re-settle the community at Mariastein Abbey, a new foundation in a pilgrimage centre, which took place in 1648. In anticipation of this, Mariastein became a member of the Swiss Congregation, now part of the Benedictine Confederation. From Mariastein, at the end of the 18th century, it was at length possible to revive Beinwil, and at that time the church and the monastic premises were rebuilt.

The abbey was however suppressed in 1874 by plebiscite during the Kulturkampf, and the community of Mariastein went into exile.

Present day
The abbey church, dedicated to Saint Vincent of Saragossa was destroyed by fire in 1978. It has now been comprehensively restored and a high altar has been installed, dated about 1700, from Bellwald. Until 2019, the former abbey was used as a ecumenical conference and retreat centre. In January 2019 it became an orthodox monastery with both monks and nuns. The local catholic parish continues to use the abbey church, with the monastery using the crypt. About 12 rooms are available for visitors to rent.

References

External links
Kloster Beinwil website 

Benedictine monasteries in Switzerland
1085 establishments in Europe
11th-century establishments in Switzerland
1874 disestablishments in Switzerland
Christian monasteries established in the 11th century
Buildings and structures in the canton of Solothurn